Myria Alexandra Benedetti (born February 6, 1975) or commonly known as Nat Myria, is a Thai singer, actress, model and television presenter.

Early life
Myria Alexandra Benedetti, is the only child of her Thai mother and Swiss-Italian father. Although she started out as an actress at an early age and still acts in many Thai dramas, movies, and stage productions, she is best known as a talented singer. She also used to host a talk show called Anne-Nat Unlimited with her best friend, actress Anne Thongprasom.

Career
Benedetti was first recognized for her singing abilities when she performed as a guest in Bird Thongchai's Yahk Hen Taung Fah Pen Yang Nai Fun Concert. Soon after this, she was given the opportunity to record a soundtrack for a drama she was starring in (Keu Hatata Kraung Pipop). She soon was offered a contract with GMM Grammy and was featured in the 6.2.12 special album with fellow Thai artists Christina Aguilar, Jay Jetrin, Mos Patiparn, Tata Young and UHT. The following year, Benedetti released her first solo album (Nat Myria Benedetti).

Music
 Album "Vietrio & Friends" - Special Album (GMM Grammy) released 16 September 2010
 Album "Forever Love Hits By Nat Myria" - Special Album (GMM Grammy) released 30 June 2010
 Album "Get Up Beautiful" - (GMM Grammy) released 14 July 2008
 Album "Chill Time" - Special Album (GMM Grammy) released 31 October 2006
 Album "Sleepless Society Vol. 2" - Special Album (GMM Grammy) released 29 August 2006
 Album "Life&Love" (GMM Grammy) released 17 February 2006
 Album "Chud Rub Kaek" - Special Album (Grammy Entertainment) released 5 November 2002
 Album "We Love Carpenters" - Special Album (Grammy Entertainment) released 2002
 Album "Emotion" (Grammy Entertainment) released 24 January 2002
 Album "Unrealeased" - Special Album (Grammy Entertainment) released 16 October 2001
 Album "Seven" - Special Album (Grammy Entertainment) released 30 November 2000
 Album "Colorful" (Grammy Entertainment) released 21 September 2000
 Album "Freshy Myria" (Grammy Entertainment) released 25 March 1999
 Album "Sugar Free" (Grammy Entertainment) released 20 January 1998
 Album "Mini Album Happy Birthday" - Special Album (Grammy Entertainment) released 6 February 1997
 Album "Nat Myria Benedetti" (Grammy Entertainment) released 6 February 1996
 Album "6.2.12" - Special Album (Grammy Entertainment) released 9 January 1996

Drama Series

 Tra Baap Sri Klao : Channel 5 (2010)
 Khun Nai Sai Lub : Channel 5 (2006)
 Shai Yai Ruk : Channel 5 (2004)
 Jao Chao Sai Fah Labb : Channel 3 (2002)
 Wang Waree : Channel 3 (2001)
 Cha Poh Hua Jai Hai Tur : Channel 5 (1999)
 Ni Yai Ruk Paak Song : Channel 5 (1998)
 Dang Duang Harutai : Channel 7 (1996)
 Keu Hatata Kraung Pipop : Channel 7 (1995)
 Nam Sai Jai Jing: Channel 7 (1994)

Ads
 Trylagina supreme collagen advance booster serum (2016)
 Olay Total Effect Shower Cream (2010)
 Olay Total Effect Cream (2007, 2009)
 Systema Toothpaste(2006)
 Bigen Prominous Hair Dye (2005)

On Stage
 Mae Nak Pra Kanong The Musical (May - July 2009)
 Fah Jarod Sai (24 May - 7 June 2007)
 Aroka

Awards

References

External links

 Nat Myria's Fansite

Living people
1975 births
Myria Benedetti
Myria Benedetti
Myria Benedetti
Myria Benedetti
Myria Benedetti
Myria Benedetti
Myria Benedetti
Myria Benedetti
Myria Benedetti